Following the Poor Law Amendment Act 1834 individual parishes ceased to be responsible for maintaining the poor in their parish. Poor law unions were established. In west Worcestershire the Martley Poor Law Union was established to take the poor from the following parishes Abberley, Alfrick, Astley, Bransford, Broadwas, Clifton-upon-Teme, Cotheridge, Doddenham, Great Witley, Grimley, Hallow, Holt, Knightwick, Leigh, Little Witley, Lulsley, Martley, Pensax, Shelsley, Shrawley, Suckley and Wichenford.

References

Poor law unions in England
History of Worcestershire